Chengqu, is a district of Shanwei, Guangdong Province, People's Republic of China.

The district includes Shanwei's central urban area, as well as nearby towns and localities, such as Dongzhou.

The People's Republic of China claims the Pratas Islands as part of Chengqu. The island is part of Cijin District, Kaohsiung, Taiwan (ROC).

References

External links

County-level divisions of Guangdong
Shanwei